Quiz Me Quick is a Flemish fiction series produced by Koeken Troef for the Belgian national broadcasting company Eén and the digital channel Prime Series. The series won prizes such as a Rockie Award at the World Media Festival in Banff. It first aired on Prime Series on April 29, 2012, before airing on the Flemish public channel Eén  on October 21, 2012.

Story
Five people meet each other coincidentally in a pub where a quiz is about to start. They decide to form a team and participate under the name "Tafel 7" (Table 7) as they are the seventh team. Despite their contrasts in personality they agree to team up for other quizzes in the future and win the Superprestige quiz as their ultimate goal. As the series progresses each candidate reveals more secrets about themselves.

Cast
 Dirk Van Dijck – Roger Sterckx
 The eldest and smartest of the group. He is a grumpy, eccentric loner. Due to his knowledge, insight and experience with quizzes he is accepted by the group. Despite his gigantic knowledge, he made the biggest blunder in the Flemish history of quizzes. He once participated in the Belgian television show 'De IQ-Kwis' (The I.Q. Quiz). Instead of answering 'the horse of Troy' on some question, he said 'the horse of Paris' where he wanted to refer to Paris, the son of the king of Troy. Since then, he stopped playing quizzes.

 Jos Verbist – Armand De La Ruelle
 Armand is a former school teacher. He gave ancient Greek and Latin and knows everything about these cultures. Due to some tragic events in past he is now addicted to alcohol. He is neglected by his colleagues and is now a "simple" supervisor in the study hall and works at the schools reprography. In contradiction the students adore Armand as he is a good narrator and his stories about the ancient Greek times are appreciated. However, due to his alcoholic abuse he gets drunk and makes serious errors when questions are asked.

 Tom Audenaert – Luc Auwerckx
 Luc is married with Gwendy and they have 3 children. He was a talented soccer player but was forced to stop after his father got blind. Luc took over his fathers photographic shop with aversion. Luc never did market research nor followed courses. As a result, the shop only sells outdated cameras and develops rolls of film as Luc is even not aware digital cameras and online printing services exist. Luc is sometimes asked to make photo reports but the customers always complain about the disappointing result. In his leisure time he trains the juniors. He knows almost all facts about sports.

 Pieter Piron - Lennon
 Lennon has a mental handicap. He works in a sheltered workshop and is terrorized by his supervisor Benny. He never learned to read and write. He loves music and movies and has a rather good auditive memory.

 Wietse Tanghe – Nick Van Loo
 This young man is a jack of all trades. Although he is a talented cook, he first works as delivery boy in some Japanese restaurant. Later on he starts at a call center. He is very smart and is able to memorize useless facts. He lives with his girlfriend Cynthia on the third floor in the city centre. He is the one who convinces the others to go to the Superprestige Quiz.

 Liesa Naert – Cynthia Moons
 She is a hairdresser. After the hairdressing salon burns down, she starts her own shop together with Gwendy. The shop becomes a success after they decide not only to do the hair of humans, but also dogs. She is in love with Nick but is always disappointed when he is fired again.

 Tine Embrechts – Gwendy
 She is married with Luc and a very assertive woman. She overawes everyone.

 Rilke Eyckermans – Tamara
 A naive colleague of Cynthia. She flirts with every man she meets.

 Kevin Janssens - Mario
 He starts as a dog-trimmer in the salon of Cynthia although he is not qualified. He seems to have a good relationship with dogs as he even can handle the most aggressive ones. Mario is rather clumsy and childish. He is in love with Cyntia. It turns out he is a former para commando and in battle some years ago. Although he is not in the army anymore, he wants to solve many issues with violence or techniques used in the army.

 Bart De Pauw – Iwein
 He is the leader of Coromar, the best Belgian quiz team.

 Clara Cleymans - Monica
 The sexy Monica is fascinated with Nick. She is a headstrong and wants to have Nick for herself.

Trivia
 De IQ-Kwis, which is part of the series' plot, was a real-life TV quiz broadcast on the Belgian public TV channel between 1980 and 1994. Footage of Roger Sterckx participating in this quiz in the 1980s was shown in the series, causing many viewers to assume this was genuine archive footage. In reality the set of De IQ-Kwis was rebuilt during production of Quiz Me Quick and combined with old archive footage of the actual show. Former host Herman Van Molle recorded lines from the script, which was edited with trick photography.

Awards and nominations
The series was nominated at the French Séries Mania
The series won a Rockie Award at the World Media Festival in Banff, Alberta in category "best sitcom."
Tine Embrechts won a Belgian Television Star for her role as Gwendy

References

Flemish television shows
2012 Belgian television series debuts
2012 Belgian television series endings
Belgian drama television shows
Belgian comedy television shows
Quizzes and game shows in popular culture
Television shows set in Belgium